Queensferry, also called South Queensferry or simply "The Ferry", is a town to the west of Edinburgh, Scotland. Traditionally a royal burgh of West Lothian, it is administered by the City of Edinburgh council area. It lies ten miles to the north-west of Edinburgh city centre, on the shore of the Firth of Forth between the Forth Bridge, Forth Road Bridge and the Queensferry Crossing. The prefix South serves to distinguish it from North Queensferry, on the opposite shore of the Forth. Both towns derive their name from the ferry service established by Queen Margaret in the 11th century, which continued to operate at the town until 1964, when the Road Bridge was opened.

Its population at the 2011 census was 9,026 based on the 2010 definition of the locality which in addition to the burgh includes Dalmeny.

Toponymy
The Gaelic name Taobh a Deas Chas Chaolais means "[the] Southern Side of [the] Steep Strait". The name "Cas Chaolas" (Steep Strait) is older than the English name; it can be applied to either North or South Queensferry, or both. The queen referred to is Saint Margaret of Scotland who is believed to have established a ferry at this point for pilgrims on their way north to St Andrews. She died in 1093 and made her final journey by ferry to Dunfermline Abbey. Her son, David I of Scotland, awarded the ferry rights to the abbey.

Local Traditions

Christmas in Queensferry 

A local showcase of talent and celebration in preparation for Christmas. The community gather together for a series of performances from Queensferry’s local people. The night ends with a firework display and a switch on of the towns decoration. The show is hosted by familiar faces in the town such as Councillor Norman Work, Ben Graham and Ross Graham, Adam Mitchell or Luke Cumming-McMillan and Jonathan Riley (current).

The Ferry Fair 
A local fair dates from the 12th century. The modern fair, dating from the 1930s, takes place each August and includes the crowning of a local school-girl as the Ferry Fair Queen, accompanied by a Ferry Fair Court of other school-children, a procession of floats, pipe bands, and competitive events such as the Boundary Race. The Fair had a dedicated radio station, Jubilee1, which in May 2007 was awarded a licence to evolve into a full Public Service Community Station for North and South Queensferry.

The Burry Man 

Queensferry hosts the strange annual procession of the Burry Man during the Ferry Fair. This unique cultural event is over three hundred years old, and likely pagan in origin. The name 'Burry Man' almost certainly refers to the hooked fruits of the burdock plant - burrs - in which he is covered, although some have suggested that it is a corruption of 'Burgh Man', since the town is traditionally a royal burgh.

A local man is covered from head-to-toe in sticky burrs which adhere to undergarments covering his entire body, leaving only the shoes, hands and two eye holes exposed. On top of this layer he wears a sash, flowers and a floral hat and he grasps two staves.  His ability to bend his arms or sit down is very restricted during the long day and his progress is a slow walk with frequent pauses. Two attendants in ordinary clothes assist him throughout the ordeal, helping him hold the staves, guiding his route, and fortifying him with whisky sipped through a straw, whilst enthusiastic children go from door-to-door collecting money on his behalf. The key landmarks on the tour are the Provost's office and each pub in the village.

The Loony Dook 

The name "Loony dook" is a combination of "Loony" (short for "lunatic") and "dook", a Scots term meaning "dip" or "bathe", and is an event whereby people dive into the freezing waters of the Firth of Forth on New Year's Day, often in fancy dress. In recent years the event has attracted people from all over the world, including many people visiting Edinburgh to celebrate Hogmanay. A proposal to charge people to participate in this event was introduced in 2011, the proceeds of which benefit RNLI Queensferry.

The event was conceived in 1986 as a joking suggestion by three locals for a New Year's Day hangover cure. The following year it was decided to repeat the event for charity. It has grown to become part of the official Edinburgh Hogmanay celebrations. Until 2010 the event was organised by locals and started from the Moorings pub (now the Inchcolm) but from 2011, due to factors such as increased crowds, safety issues and popularity, the event has been handled by the organisers of Edinburgh's Hogmanay, with the parade now starting from the Hawes Promenade at the other end of the town. Up to 2016 two of the original Dookers, James MacKenzie and Ian 'Rambo' Armstrong, have the distinction of taking part in every Loony Dook and the two wore specially designed T-shirts with 30yrs to celebrate the achievement.

The event has inspired similar, though smaller in scale, annual New Year Loony Dooks, such as in North Berwick in East Lothian and Kirkcaldy in Fife, both also on the Firth of Forth.

Brass band 
Queensferry has a community brass band that evolved from being a school brass band to a youth band and finally to its present status as a competing adult band. It came third in the 2006 Scottish Brass Band Championships 4th section contest and fourth in 2007. In addition to competing, it takes part in many community events including the Ferry Fair and Christmas in Queensferry light switch on event
In addition to this there is a school brass band that has won the Community section of the Scottish Youth Brass Band Championships in 2005 and 2006.

Places of interest

Churches 
St Mary's Episcopal Church, also known as the Priory Church, is the town's oldest building, built for the Carmelite Order of friars in the 1450s.  It is the only medieval Carmelite church still in use in the British Isles, and is a Category A listed building. After the Scottish Reformation of 1560 it served as the parish church until 1635. In 1890 it was reconsecrated for the Scottish Episcopal Church.

The Old Parish Church on The Vennel dates from 1633 and has an interesting early graveyard. The church became known as the South Church in 1929, and served the Church of Scotland congregation until 1956, when it united with St Andrew's Church. The old South Church building was sold in 1970 and is now a house.

The building which now houses Queensferry Parish Church, located in The Loan, was originally built as South Queensferry United Free Church. Following the union of the Church of Scotland and the United Free Church of Scotland in 1929, the UF Church became known as St Andrew's Church and the old Church of Scotland congregation as the South Church. The two congregations were united in 1956, becoming Queensferry Parish Church. The Reverend John Carrie was minister from 1971 until his untimely death in 2008. In 1972 he started an annual sponsored walk across the Forth Road Bridge for Christian Aid, so far raising over £1,000,000. In 2009 the Rev. David Cameron transferred from Newton Mearns to Queensferry Parish Church.

St Margaret's Roman Catholic church is also located on The Loan. Mass is held daily and taken by Father Tony.

Stately homes 
 Hopetoun House - Two miles to the west, a splendid Georgian stately home designed by the Scottish architects Sir William Bruce and William Adam and situated in 150 acres (607,000 m²) of parkland. Home to the Earls of Hopetoun since 1699. 
 Dalmeny House - Two miles to the east, Dalmeny House was built by English architect William Wilkins in 1817 and is the home of the Earls of Rosebery. It houses the Rosebery and some of the Rothschild collections.
 Dundas Estate - One mile to the south. A 9-hole golf course has been established in its parkland since the 1920s. Each year it hosts a "The Life of Jesus Christ", an Oberammergau-type open-air passion play.

Other significant buildings 

Black Castle is a house on the High Street built in 1626. When the original owner, a sea-captain, was lost at sea, his maid was accused of paying a beggar-woman to cast a spell. Both women were burned for witchcraft. Plewlands House is a 17th-century mansion in the centre of the village. It was restored in the 1950s as flats, and is now managed by the National Trust for Scotland. South Queensferry Tolbooth, on the High Street, dates from the 17th century, with a clock-tower built in 1720.

The Hawes Inn, dating from the 17th century, lies east of Queensferry, almost under the Forth Bridge on its south side. It features in Robert Louis Stevenson's novel Kidnapped. Opposite the Hawes Inn is the pier which served the ferry (from which the town derives its name) until the opening of the Forth Road Bridge. The pier is now used by tourist boats including the ferry to Inchcolm.

South Queensferry Cemetery on Ferrymuir Lane at the south end of the town is unremarkable other than for the very large number of Royal Navy war graves, many for casualties of the Battle of Jutland (1916) who were brought here for burial. It is maintained and operated by the City of Edinburgh Council. It superseded the small graveyard on The Vennel in the centre of town.

Opened in March 2007 by Dakota Hotels, the 'black box' seen from the A90 is a hotel, Bar & Grill.

Mesolithic settlement 
In 2012 as part of the excavations for the new Forth road crossing archaeologists excavated the remains of a mesolithic dwelling dating to around 10,000 years ago and believed to be the earliest home discovered in Scotland, and possibly the entire UK.

Schools 

Queensferry has four primary schools (Echline Primary, Queensferry Primary, St Margaret's RC Primary and Dalmeny Primary) and one secondary school (Queensferry High School), with Kirkliston Primary also part of its catchment area.

Food and drink 
There are a large selection of pubs, bars and restaurants within Queensferry. The High Street is home to many bars and restaurants, such as the Ferry Tap, Anchor Inn, Staghead Hotel (The Stag), Orocco Pier (formerly Queensferry Arms), Boathouse. The area is also the location of many ice cream and confectionary shops, such as The Little Parlour and Once Upon A Time.

The local brewery, Ferry Brewery, makes beers named after landmarks around the town, including the Ferry Crossing and the Three Bridges.

Commercial development 
In recent decades in Queensferry there has been significant commercial development of the Ferrymuir area to the south of the town by the A90 road into Edinburgh. Development includes a large Tesco, Burger King, McDonald's, Dakota and a Premier Inn. It is also home to an NHS 24 call centre and the Scottish Ambulance Service East Control Room. Further into the town, The Loan Centre, along with South Queensferry Medical Practice, stands on the site of the former VAT 69 distillery.

Transport
Queensferry is served by bus services operated by: Lothian Country, McGill's Scotland East and Stagecoach East Scotland.

Dalmeny railway station is located to the east of South Queensferry, where ScotRail operates services on its Fife Circle route.

Notable residents 
 Paul Appleby, professional featherweight boxer
 David Boner, former footballer
 Ben Chatwin, musician
 Julia Cross, former ITF Taekwon-Do World Champion
 Stephen Hendry, professional snooker player
 Jim Kerr and Chrissie Hynde, musicians
 Ken MacLeod, science fiction writer
 Anna Meredith, composer
 Callum Paterson, professional footballer
 Robert Stodart Wyld FRSE (1808-1893), distiller and philosopher, Provost of Queensferry from 1852 to 1861

References

External links

 Flora Celtica: The Burry Man
 History of the Ferry Fair
 Queensferry and District Community Council
 Queensferry History Group
 Ferry Fair Festival
 Queensferry Parish Church

 
Towns in Edinburgh council area
Royal burghs
Populated coastal places in Scotland